Erythranthe purpurea is a species of monkeyflower known by the common name little purple monkeyflower. It was formerly known as Mimulus purpureus.

Distribution
It is native to California, where it is known from only about 20 occurrences in the San Bernardino Mountains; it is also known from Baja California. It grows in moist habitat in mountain meadows, including the quartz pebble plain habitat type near Big Bear Lake.

Description
Erythranthe purpurea is a petite annual herb growing just a few centimeters tall. The oppositely arranged oval leaves are under 2 centimeters long each. Each flower is borne on a very thin, erect pedicel which may be several centimeters tall.

The tubular base of the flower is encapsulated in a reddish ribbed calyx of sepals with tiny pointed lobes. The flower is roughly a centimeter long with a wide mouth divided into an upper and lower lip. The flower is pink, the upper lip usually a darker shade than the lower, and there are yellow stripes or streaks in the mouth.

References

External links
Jepson Manual Treatment — Mimulus purpureus
USDA Plants Profile: Mimulus purpureus
Mimulus purpureus — U.C. Photo gallery

purpurea
Flora of California
Flora of Baja California
Natural history of the Peninsular Ranges
Natural history of the Transverse Ranges
~
Flora without expected TNC conservation status